Albert John Collins (16 January 1899 – 1 December 1969) was an English footballer who played professionally for clubs including Millwall and Gillingham. He made 170 Football League appearances for the latter club. On leaving Gillingham he went into non-League football, first with Tunbridge Wells Rangers and finally with Canterbury Waverley.

References

1899 births
1969 deaths
People from Sheerness
English footballers
Gillingham F.C. players
Millwall F.C. players
Tunbridge Wells F.C. players
Canterbury Waverley F.C. players
English Football League players
Association football central defenders